Antonius Hubertus Maria "Antoine" Bouwens (22 May 1876 – 28 March 1963) was a Dutch sport shooter who competed in the early 20th century in pistol shooting. He participated in Shooting at the 1900 Summer Olympics in Paris and won a bronze medal with the Dutch pistol team. He also competed at the 1920 Summer Olympics.

References

External links
 

1876 births
1963 deaths
Dutch male sport shooters
Olympic bronze medalists for the Netherlands
Olympic medalists in shooting
Olympic shooters of the Netherlands
Shooters at the 1900 Summer Olympics
Shooters at the 1920 Summer Olympics
People from Leudal
Medalists at the 1900 Summer Olympics
Sportspeople from Limburg (Netherlands)
20th-century Dutch people